Wath upon Dearne is a town in the Metropolitan Borough of Rotherham, South Yorkshire, England.  The town and surrounding area contain 15 listed buildings that are recorded in the National Heritage List for England.  Of these, one is listed at Grade I, the highest of the three grades, and the others are at Grade II, the lowest grade.  The listed buildings include houses, farmhouses and farm buildings, a church, a former town hall, a public house, a former smithy, a former lock-up, and a mausoleum.


Key

Buildings

References

Citations

Sources

 

Lists of listed buildings in South Yorkshire
Buildings and structures in the Metropolitan Borough of Rotherham